Max Delhees (born 2 July 1960) is a Swiss handball player. He competed in the men's tournament at the 1984 Summer Olympics.

References

1960 births
Living people
Swiss male handball players
Olympic handball players of Switzerland
Handball players at the 1984 Summer Olympics
Place of birth missing (living people)